The Anglican Diocese of the Windward Islands is one of eight dioceses within the Province of the West Indies. The current bishop is Leopold Friday.

History
Source:
The diocese was established on 8 November 1877 from the islands of St Vincent and the Grenadines, Grenada and Tobago. Tobago transferred to the Diocese of Trinidad in 1889 when those two islands were joined together politically and St Lucia joined the Windward Islands diocese in 1899. 

The new diocese shared a bishop with Barbados until 1927, when the retiring Bishop of Barbados, Alfred Berkeley, was elected as the first full-time Bishop of the Windward Isles.

The Cathedral Church of the see is St George's Cathedral in Kingstown, St Vincent.

Bishops
Bishop of Barbados (and Windward Islands) (1877–1927)
see Bishop of Barbados

Bishop of Windward Islands
1927–1930 Alfred Berkeley
1930–1936 Vibert Jackson
1936–1949 Horace Tonks
1949–1962 Ronald Shapley
1962–1969 Harold Piggott
1969–1986 Cuthbert Woodroffe
1986–1993 Philip Elder
1994–2002 Sehon Goodridge
2003–present Leopold Friday

References

External links 
 Official website

Windward Islands
 
Anglican Church in the Caribbean
Church in the Province of the West Indies